Edifenphos (O-ethyl-S,S-diphenyldithiophosphate, EDDP) is a systemic fungicide that inhibits phosphatidylcholine biosynthesis. It was introduced in 1966 by Bayer to combat blast fungus and Pellicularia sasakii in rice cultivation. It was never authorized for use in the EU.

References 

Fungicides
Organothiophosphate esters